The Taltal wind farm is a wind energy project in northern Chile. The plant's connection to the Chilean electricity grid was reported on 5 December 2014.
The name "Taltal" came from the indigenous word Thalthal, which means "night bird".

Details
The Taltal wind has 33 V112 wind turbines of 3 MW each, for a total installed capacity of 99 MW, 9 MW more than the Talinay wind farm in the region of Coquimbo, also in the north of Chile. The total investment for the construction of the new wind farm is approximately $190 million US dollars.
 
The project is supported by a 20-year power purchase agreement (PPA). The energy generated by the wind farm is delivered to the Chilean central region transmission network / SIC (Sistema Interconectado Central), through the Paposo substation, 50 km away from the plant.
The plant has the capacity to generate 300 GWh a year, preventing 200,000 tons of CO2 emissions annually and providing enough electricity to meet the power needs of 170,000 Chilean households.

Purpose

Projects like the Taltal wind farm and others of this kind, jointly organized by the Ministry of National Assets and the Ministry of Energy, aim to diversify the Chilean energy matrix, promoting the development of renewable energy to reduce carbon emissions and energy dependency from abroad, as well as enhancing power supply to support the country’s development and economic growth.

See also

 Antofagasta
 Atacama Desert
 Talinay wind farm
 Taltal

References

External links
 
 

Energy infrastructure in Antofagasta Region
Wind farms in Chile